Stiefelhöhe is an Odenwald mountain of Baden-Württemberg, Germany.

Mountains and hills of Baden-Württemberg